Lemyra burmanica is a moth of the family Erebidae. It was described by Walter Rothschild in 1910. It is found in China (Guangdong, Guangxi, Yunnan, Hunan, Sichuan, Tibet).

References

 

burmanica
Moths described in 1910